John J. Bradley (1831 in New York City – August 24, 1891 in Mahopac, Putnam County, New York) was an American politician from New York and one of the members of the infamous Tweed Ring.

Life
He ran a large livery yard on the corner of Fourth Avenue and 18th Street. He was a Councilman (57th D.) in 1856, and an Alderman (14th D.) in 1858 and 1859.

He was a member of the New York State Senate (6th D.) in 1862 and 1863.

He was again a member of the New York State Senate (7th D.) from 1868 to 1871, sitting in the 89th, 90th, 91st and 92nd New York State Legislatures.

In April 1870, he succeeded his brother-in-law Peter B. Sweeny as City Chamberlain and County Treasurer, and remained in office until January 6, 1872, when he resigned. Afterwards he resumed his business, and moved the stable to 8 East 31st Street.

Sources
 The New York Civil List compiled by Franklin Benjamin Hough, Stephen C. Hutchins and Edgar Albert Werner (1870; pg. 443f)
 Biographical Sketches of the State Officers and the Members of the Legislature of the State of New York in 1862 and '63 by William D. Murphy (1863; pg. 49ff)
 Manual of the Corporation of New York by Joseph Shannon (1869; pg. 593)
 THE SWEENYS in NYT on September 14, 1871
 "Respectable" John J. Bradley in NYT on October 31, 1871
 Six Reasons for Voting Against John J. Bradley in NYT on November 7, 1871
 Resignation of Bradley in NYT on January 8, 1872
 OBITUARY; DEATH OF JOHN J. BRADLEY in NYT on August 25, 1891

1831 births
1891 deaths
Democratic Party New York (state) state senators
New York City Council members
19th-century American politicians